Keep On Chooglin' is a Creedence Clearwater Revival compilation album released in Australasia in 1995, that includes the eponymous track, taken from the album Bayou Country. The meaning of the neologism "choogling" can be found in the lyrics of the song: "...You got to ball and have a good time / And that's what I call chooglin'."

Track listing

Disc one

 "Proud Mary" - 3:09
 "Born on the Bayou" - 5:17
 "Down on the Corner" - 2:47
 "Lookin' out My Back Door" - 2:34
 "Bootleg" - 3:03
 "The Midnight Special" - 4:14
 "Travelin' Band" - 2:10
 "Hey Tonight" - 2:44
 "Have You Ever Seen the Rain?" - 2:41
 "Wrote a Song for Everyone" - 4:57
 "Don't Look Now" - 2:12
 "Ramble Tamble" - 7:13
 "Commotion" - 2:45
 "My Baby Left Me" - 2:20
 "Lookin' for a Reason" - 3:29
 "I Heard It Through the Grapevine" (Extended version) - 11:05
 "Susie Q, Pt. 2" - 4:00

Disc two

 "Hello Mary Lou" - 2:15
 "Good Golly Miss Molly" - 2:44
 "Born to Move" - 5:42
 "Lodi" - 3:12
 "It Came Out of the Sky" - 2:55
 "I Put a Spell on You" - 4:33
 "Before You Accuse Me" - 3:27
 "Sailor's Lament" - 3:49
 "Night Time Is the Right Time" - 3:10
 "Fortunate Son" - 2:21
 "Bad Moon Rising" - 2:21
 "Green River" - 2:34
 "Who'll Stop the Rain" - 2:29
 "Up Around the Bend" - 2:43
 "Cotton Fields" - 2:57
 "Feelin' Blue" - 5:05
 "Keep on Chooglin'" - 7:41

Certifications

References

 Bordowitz, Hank (2007). Bad Moon Rising: The Unauthorized History of Creedence Clearwater Revival. Chicago Review Press. .

1999 greatest hits albums
Creedence Clearwater Revival compilation albums
Albums produced by Doug Clifford
Albums produced by John Fogerty
Albums produced by Saul Zaentz
Albums produced by Stu Cook